Zabrus is a genus of ground beetles. They are, unusually for ground beetles, omnivores or even herbivores, and Zabrus tenebrioides can become a pest in cereal fields.

Subgenera
The following are subgenera of Zabrus:
 Aulacozabrus Ganglbauer
 Cantabrozabrus Anichtchenko & Ruiz-Tapiador, 2008
 Craspedozabrus Ganglbauer, 1915
 Epomidozabrus Ganglbauer, 1915
 Euryzabrus Ganglbauer, 1915
 Eutroctes Zimmermann, 1831
 Himalayozabrus Andújar & Serrano, 2000
 Iberozabrus Ganglbauer, 1915
 Italozabrus Andújar & Serrano, 2000
 Lobozabrus Ganglbauer, 1915
 Macarozabrus Ganglbauer, 1915
 Pelor Bonelli, 1810
 Platyzabrus Jeanne, 1968
 Polysitus Zimmermann, 1831
 Zabrus Clairville, 1806

Species
Zabrus contains the following species:

 Zabrus aciculatus Schaum, 1864
 Zabrus aegaeus Apfelbeck, 1904
 Zabrus aetolus Schaum, 1864
 Zabrus albanicus Apfelbeck, 1904
 Zabrus ambiguus Rambur, 1838
 Zabrus angustatus Rambur, 1838
 Zabrus angusticollis Ganglbauer, 1915
 Zabrus apfelbecki Ganglbauer, 1915
 Zabrus arragonensis Heyden, 1883
 Zabrus asiaticus Laporte, 1834
 Zabrus aurichalceus M. F. Adams, 1817
 Zabrus balcanicus Heyden, 1883
 Zabrus bischoffi J. Müller, 1936
 Zabrus bodemeyeri Ganglbauer, 1915
 Zabrus boldorii Schatzmayr, 1943
 Zabrus brevicollis Schaum, 1857
 Zabrus brondelii Reiche, 1872
 Zabrus canaricus Machado, 1992
 Zabrus castroi Martinez y Saez, 1873
 Zabrus chalceus Faldermann, 1836
 Zabrus chiosanus Reitter, 1889
 Zabrus coiffaiti Jeanne, 1970
 Zabrus consanguineus Chevrolat, 1865
 Zabrus constrictus Graells, 1858
 Zabrus corpulentus Schaum, 1864
 Zabrus costae Heyden, 1891
 Zabrus crassus Dejean, 1828
 Zabrus curtus (Audinet-Serville, 1821)
 Zabrus damascenus Reiche & Saulcy, 1855
 Zabrus deflexicollis Fairmaire, 1880
 Zabrus distinctus H. Lucas, 1842
 Zabrus estrellanus Heyden, 1880
 Zabrus farctus C. Zimmermann, 1831
 Zabrus femoratus Dejean, 1828
 Zabrus flavangulus Chevrolat, 1840
 Zabrus foveipennis Heyden, 1883
 Zabrus foveolatus Schaum, 1864
 Zabrus fuentei Anichtchenko & Ruiz-Tapiador, 2008
 Zabrus galicianus Jeanne, 1970
 Zabrus ganglbaueri Apfelbeck, 1906
 Zabrus gibbulus Jeanne, 1985
 Zabrus graecus Dejean, 1828
 Zabrus gravis Dejean, 1828
 Zabrus guildensis Alluaud, 1932
 Zabrus hellenicus Heyden, 1883
 Zabrus helopioides Reiche & Saulcy, 1855
 Zabrus heydeni Ganglbauer, 1915
 Zabrus hiekei Anichtchenko & Gueorguiev, 2009
 Zabrus humeralis Uhagon, 1904
 Zabrus iconiensis Ganglbauer, 1905
 Zabrus idaeus Schweiger, 1968
 Zabrus ignavus Csiki, 1907
 Zabrus incrassatus (Ahrens, 1814)
 Zabrus inflatus Dejean, 1828
 Zabrus jurjurae Peyerimhoff, 1908
 Zabrus kraatzi Andujar & Serrano, 2000
 Zabrus kurdistanicus Freude, 1989
 Zabrus laevicollis Schaum, 1864
 Zabrus laevigatus C. Zimmermann, 1831
 Zabrus laticollis Apfelbeck, 1904
 Zabrus laurae Toribio, 1989
 Zabrus lycius Ganglbauer, 1915
 Zabrus malloryi Andrewes, 1930
 Zabrus marginicollis Dejean, 1828
 Zabrus maroccanus Reiche, 1864
 Zabrus martensi Freude, 1986
 Zabrus mateui Novoa, 1980
 Zabrus melancholicus Schaum, 1864
 Zabrus morio Mandrias, 1832
 Zabrus notabilis Martinez y Saez, 1873
 Zabrus obesus (Audinet-Serville, 1821)
 Zabrus oertzeni Reitter, 1885
 Zabrus orsini Dejean, 1831
 Zabrus ovalis Fairmaire, 1859
 Zabrus ovipennis Chaudoir, 1844
 Zabrus pecoudi Colas, 1942
 Zabrus pentheri Ganglbauer, 1905
 Zabrus peristericus Apfelbeck, 1904
 Zabrus pinguis Dejean, 1831
 Zabrus poggii Freude, 2002
 Zabrus politus Gautier des Cottes, 1869
 Zabrus potanini Semenov, 1889
 Zabrus prietoi Ruiz-Tapiador & Anichtchenko, 2008
 Zabrus przewalskii Semenov, 1889
 Zabrus puncticeps Schaum, 1864
 Zabrus punctifrons Fairmaire, 1866
 Zabrus punctiventris Schaum, 1864
 Zabrus reflexus Schaum, 1862
 Zabrus robustus C.Zimmermann, 1831
 Zabrus rotundatus Rambur, 1838
 Zabrus rotundicollis Ménétries, 1836
 Zabrus segnis Schaum, 1864
 Zabrus seidlitzi Schaum, 1864
 Zabrus semipunctatus Fairmaire, 1859
 Zabrus seriatus Ganglbauer, 1915
 Zabrus silphoides Dejean, 1828
 Zabrus skoupyi Hejkal, 2011
 Zabrus socialis Schaum, 1864
 Zabrus spectabilis Hampe, 1852
 Zabrus spinipes (Fabricius, 1798)
 Zabrus sublaevis Ménétries, 1836
 Zabrus tenebrioides (Goeze, 1777)
 Zabrus tenuestriatus Fairmaire, 1884
 Zabrus theveneti Chevrolat, 1874
 Zabrus toelgi Breit, 1926
 Zabrus trinii (Fischer von Waldheim, 1817)
 Zabrus tumidus Reiche & Saulcy, 1855
 Zabrus uhagoni Ruiz-Tapiador & Anichtchenko, 2008
 Zabrus urbionensis Jeanne, 1970
 Zabrus validus Schaum, 1862
 Zabrus vasconicus Uhagon, 1904
 Zabrus vaulogeri Ganglbauer, 1915
 Zabrus ventricosus (C.Zimmermann, 1831)
 Zabrus vignai Freude, 1990

References

Further reading

External links
 Zabrus tenebrioides

 
Pterostichinae